Afrique Victime is the sixth album by Tuareg musician Mdou Moctar. It was released on 21 May 2021 as the artist's first album with Matador Records and received positive reviews from international publications including Rolling Stone, Paste, Pitchfork, and The Guardian. The album is sung almost entirely in Tamasheq, though parts (including the name of the album and its title song) are in French.

The band released a companion documentary about the making of the album, including the difficulties faced with their bandmembers living on two continents: three Nigerien musicians and one American, their producer and bassist, Mikey Coltun.

Several critics added the album to their end-of-year best album lists for 2021, including the New York Times (number 5), Pitchfork (number 8), The Guardian (number 10), Rolling Stone (number 26), and Consequence (number 35). Many Youtube Review channels have also offered praise, including "Davy's Cinema Flicks & Music Picks" which placed it as the best album of the year.

Track listing

Charts

References

2021 albums
Matador Records albums
Desert blues albums